This is a list of people who have served as Custos Rotulorum of Montgomeryshire.
 Sir John Salusbury before 1544 – c. 1548
 Edward Herbert before 1558–1593
 Richard Herbert 1594–1596
 Richard Broughton 1596–1602
 William Herbert, 1st Baron Powis 1602–1641
 Philip Herbert, 4th Earl of Pembroke 1641–1643
 Herbert Vaughan 1643–1646
 Interregnum
 Edward Vaughan Mar–July 1660 
 Edward Herbert, 3rd Baron Herbert of Chirbury 1660–1678
 Hon. Andrew Newport Jan – Dec 1679
 Henry Herbert, 4th Baron Herbert of Chirbury 1679–1685
 Hon. Andrew Newport 1685–1687
 William Herbert, 1st Marquess of Powis 1687–1689
 Henry Herbert, 4th Baron Herbert of Chirbury 1689–1691
 Hon. Andrew Newport 1691–1699
 Charles Gerard, 2nd Earl of Macclesfield 1700–1701
 Richard Newport, 2nd Earl of Bradford 1701–1711
 Price Devereux, 9th Viscount Hereford 1711–1714
 Richard Newport, 2nd Earl of Bradford 1714–1723
 Henry Newport, 3rd Earl of Bradford 1724–1734
 Henry Herbert, 1st Earl of Powis 1735–1772
For later custodes rotulorum, see Lord Lieutenant of Montgomeryshire.

References

Institute of Historical Research - Custodes Rotulorum 1544-1646
Institute of Historical Research - Custodes Rotulorum 1660-1828

Montgomeryshire